Günter Jäger (born 21 December 1935) is a German former footballer who played as a defender for Fortuna Düsseldorf and Wuppertaler SV. He also played once for the Germany national team in 1958, and represented his country in the 1956 Summer Olympics.

References

External links
 
 

1935 births
Living people
German footballers
Association football defenders
Fortuna Düsseldorf players
Wuppertaler SV players
Footballers at the 1956 Summer Olympics
Germany international footballers
Olympic footballers of the United Team of Germany
West German footballers
People from Haan
Sportspeople from Düsseldorf (region)
Footballers from North Rhine-Westphalia